The 1852 United States presidential election in Georgia took place on November 2, 1852, as part of the 1852 United States presidential election. Voters chose 10 representatives, or electors to the Electoral College, who voted for President and Vice President.

Georgia voted for the Democratic candidate, Franklin Pierce, over Commanding General Winfield Scott, the nominee of the Whig Party, and Senator Daniel Webster. Having been denied the Whig nomination at the party's 1852 National Convention, Webster was placed on the ballot without permission by a group of former Whigs, known as the Know Nothings, but died of natural causes shortly before the election. Pierce won Georgia by a margin of 38.10%.

Results

References

Georgia
1852
1852 Georgia (U.S. state) elections